Shinagawa East One Tower (しながわイーストワンタワー) is a 32-story intelligent building which was built in Konan, which is a redevelopment area of Minato-ku, Tokyo. The construction of the building was started in 2000, and was completed on 31 March 2003.
 
The main functions of the building are office and retail space for companies, restaurants, retail establishments and clinics. As with many buildings in Japan this one also is equipped with energy absorption style seismic motion mitigation device.

The Shinagawa East One Tower houses the corporate headquarters of its owner, Daito Trust Construction.

Tenants

Office tenants

Daito Trust Construction headquarters
Broadcom Japan headquarters
Regus offices
Berlitz language school

Clinics 
 Shinagawa East One Medical Clinic
 Shinagawa East One Skin Clinic
 Shinagawa Bayside Ophthalmology
 East One Dental Clinic

Hotel

The upper floors of the building are occupied by  The Strings by InterContinental Tokyo.

Restaurants 

There are several izakaya type restaurant establishments in the building.

References

External links 

Buildings and structures in Minato, Tokyo
Skyscraper office buildings in Tokyo
Modernist architecture in Japan
Commercial buildings completed in 2003
Skyscraper hotels in Tokyo
Retail buildings in Tokyo
2003 establishments in Japan